Love Me, Please Love Me is the third original album or LP by 1960s British singer Sandie Shaw. It was issued by Pye Records in November 1967, several months after Shaw's triumph in that year's Eurovision Song Contest. The album mainly contains cover versions of popular songs made by other artists, like Michel Polnareff's "Love Me, Please Love Me", even though two songs are written by Chris Andrews, who was Shaw's personal songwriter for much of the 1960s.

Track listing
 "Love Me, Please Love Me" (Barbara Moore, Michel Polnareff)
 "One Note Samba" (Antônio Carlos Jobim, Jon Hendricks, Newton Mendonça)
 "Smile" (Charlie Chaplin, Geoffrey Parsons, John Turner)
 "Yes My Darling Daughter" (Albert Sirmay, Jack Lawrence)
 "Ne Me Quitte Pas" (Jacques Brel)
 "Every Time We Say Goodbye" (Cole Porter)
 "The Way That I Remember Him" (Geoff Stephens)
 "Hold 'im Down" (Chris Andrews)
 "I Get a Kick Out of You" (Cole Porter)
 "Time After Time" (Jule Styne, Sammy Cahn)
 "That's Why" (Chris Andrews)
 "By Myself" (Arthur Schwartz, Howard Dietz)

1967 albums
Sandie Shaw albums
Pye Records albums